Thomas Sawyer (born 14 October 1969) is an Irish professional darts player who currently plays in World Darts Federation events. He qualified for the 2017 BDO World Darts Championship.

Career
In 2012, Sawyer reached the Quarter-final of the WDF World Cup Singles. In 2014 he reached the Semi-final of the WDF Americas Cup Singles. He qualified for the 2017 BDO World Darts Championship where he lost 0-3 to Paul Hogan in the preliminary round.

World Championship results

BDO
 2017: Preliminary round (lost to Paul Hogan 0-3) (sets)

References

External links
Profile and stats on Darts Database

1969 births
Living people
American emigrants to Ireland
British Darts Organisation players